Leontopodium japonicum is a species of plant in the family Asteraceae. It is native to Japan and China.

References

japonicum
Plants described in 1866